Champagney may refer to three communes in France, in the region of Franche-Comté:
Champagney, Doubs
Champagney, Jura
Champagney, Haute-Saône